Moira de Villiers (born 16 March 1990) is a South African-born New Zealand judoka. She competed in the 70 kg event at the 2012 Summer Olympics losing in the first round. She competed in the women's 70 kg event at the 2014 Commonwealth Games where she won the silver medal.

References

External links
 
 
 

1990 births
Living people
New Zealand female judoka
Judoka at the 2012 Summer Olympics
Olympic judoka of New Zealand
Commonwealth Games silver medallists for New Zealand
Judoka at the 2014 Commonwealth Games
Commonwealth Games medallists in judo
South African emigrants to New Zealand
20th-century New Zealand women
21st-century New Zealand women
Medallists at the 2014 Commonwealth Games